Voyage Without Hope (French: Voyage sans espoir) is a French 1943 French crime drama film directed by Christian-Jaque and starring Simone Renant, Jean Marais and Paul Bernard. It was shot at the Saint-Maurice Studios in Paris. The film's sets were designed by the art director Robert Gys. It has been classified as a film noir with an opening that recalls the pre-war poetic realist film The Human Beast.

Synopsis
A bank clerk steals money and plans to run off to Argentina on a freighter. On the train to the port he encounters a criminal just released from prison who takes him for a naïve, wealthy young man and persuades his old girlfriend, nightclub singer Marie-Ange, to seduce him. However, she falls in love with the essentially honest boy and as the net closes in against him from both the criminals and the law she ultimately sacrifices herself for him.

Cast 
 Simone Renant as  Marie-Ange
 Jean Marais as Alain Ginestier
 Paul Bernard as  Pierre Gohelle
 Jean Brochard as  Inspector Chapelin
 Louis Salou as  Inspector Sorbier
 Ky Duyen as  Li-Fang
 Lucien Coëdel as  Philippe Dejanin
 Marcel Maupi as 	Le barman
 Clary Monthal as 	Laura - l'habilleuse

References

Bibliography
Walker-Morrison, Deborah. Classic French Noir: Gender and the Cinema of Fatal Desire. Bloomsbury Publishing, 2020.

External links 
 

1943 films
French drama films
1940s French-language films
Films directed by Christian-Jaque
French black-and-white films
Remakes of French films
1943 drama films
1940s French films